Minot's Ledge Light, officially Minots Ledge Light, is a lighthouse  on Minots Ledge, one mile offshore of the towns of Cohasset and Scituate, Massachusetts, to the southeast of Boston Harbor. It is a part of the Town of Cohassett, in Plymouth County. The current lighthouse is the second on the site, the first having been washed away in a storm after only a few months of use.

First lighthouse

In 1843, lighthouse inspector I. W. P. Lewis compiled a report on Minots Ledge, showing that more than 40 vessels had been lost due to striking the ledge from 1832 to 1841, with serious loss of life and damage to property. The most dramatic incident was the sinking of a ship "St John" in October 1849 with ninety-nine Irish immigrants, who all drowned within sight of their new homeland. It was initially proposed to build a lighthouse similar to John Smeaton's pioneering Eddystone Lighthouse, situated off the south-west coast of England. However Captain William H. Swift, put in charge of planning the tower, believed it impossible to build such a tower on the mostly submerged ledge. Instead he successfully argued for an iron pile light, a spidery structure drilled into the rock.

The first Minot's Ledge Lighthouse was built between 1847 and 1850, and was lighted for the first time on January 1, 1850. One night in April 1851, the new lighthouse was struck by a major storm that caused damage throughout the Boston area. The following day only a few bent pilings were found on the rock. The two assistant keepers who had been tending the lighthouse at the time had died at their posts.

The current lighthouse
Until 1863 the design and construction of lighthouses was the responsibility of the Corps of Topographical Engineers; this resulted in a rivalry with the longer-established Army Corps of Engineers, which built fortifications and had responsibility, as it does today, for waterway improvements.  The Chief Engineer of the Army Corps of Engineers, Joseph G. Totten,  personally took charge of the project to design and construct a permanent lighthouse on Minot's Ledge.

Totten's design was as simple as it was effective.  With extensive experience building fortifications, Totten fully appreciated the permanency and strength of granite constructions.  He designed the lighthouse so the first 40 feet of lighthouse would be a solid granite base weighing thousands of tons.  To secure the lighthouse to the ledge, he had several massive iron pins emplaced so that the lighthouse would be literally pinned to the ledge by its own weight.  Working on the ledge could take place only in conditions when it was exposed at low tide and the sea was calm, so construction took years.

Work started on the current lighthouse in 1855, and it was completed and first lit on November 15, 1860. With a final cost of $300,000, it was the most expensive light house that was ever constructed in the United States to that date.  The lighthouse is built of large and heavy dovetailed granite blocks, which were cut and dressed ashore in Quincy and taken to the ledge by ship. The lighthouse was equipped with a third-order Fresnel lens.

The light signal, a 1-4-3 flashing cycle adopted in 1894, is locally referred to as "I LOVE YOU" (1-4-3 being the number of letters in that phrase), and it is often cited as such by romantic couples within its range.

Minots Ledge Light was automated in 1947.

Historical information

The following is taken from the Coast Guard Historian's website:

Minot's Ledge Lighthouse keepers in 1940: George H. Fitzpatrick, Perc A. Evans, Patrick J. Bridy

Minot's Ledge Lighthouse was designated as a National Historic Civil Engineering Landmark by the American Society of Civil Engineers in 1977. The light was added to the National Register of Historic Places in 1987 as Minot's Ledge Light.

It was put up for sale under the National Historic Lighthouse Preservation Act in 2009.

Nomenclature and location

Officially, it is Minots Ledge Light, but the National Register listing calls it Minot's Ledge Light. 

There is a replica of the top section of the lighthouse, located on the shores of Cohasset Harbor. The replica can be viewed just outside the Cohasset Sailing Club. The replica on shore is not a replica, but instead is made from the stone and steel remnants of the original upper portion of the lighthouse including the lamp chamber, which was wholly rebuilt in the late twentieth century, the copper dome is in fact a replica..  It is located about one mile off of the coast of Scituate Neck.

See also
Government Island Historic District, the Cohasset land station associated with the lighthouse
National Register of Historic Places in Plymouth County, Massachusetts

References

External links

 Minot's Ledge poem. Fitz-James O'Brien, Harper's New Monthly Magazine, April 1861. audio recording, 2006, Public Domain.

Scituate, Massachusetts
Collapsed buildings in the United States
Disasters in Massachusetts
1851 disasters in the United States
Historic Civil Engineering Landmarks
Lighthouses completed in 1850
Lighthouses completed in 1860
Lighthouses in Plymouth County, Massachusetts
Lighthouses on the National Register of Historic Places in Massachusetts